Erythrolamprus pyburni, Pyburn's tropical forest snake, is a species of snake in the family Colubridae. The species is endemic to Colombia. It is only known from its type locality, Loma Linda in the Meta Department.

Etymology
The specific name, pyburni, is in honor of American herpetologist  (1927–2007).

References

Erythrolamprus
Snakes of South America
Reptiles of Colombia
Endemic fauna of Colombia
Reptiles described in 1979
Taxa named by James R. Dixon